The Curse of Quon Gwon: When the Far East Mingles with the West is a black-and-white silent film. Filmed circa 1916 or 1917, it was never released and long thought lost. Two reels of an estimated total of seven or eight survived and were restored, rendering the film incomplete.

Background
Marion E. Wong created the Mandarin Film Company in Oakland, California and served as its president. In an interview with the Oakland Tribune in 1916, she expressed her interest in presenting Chinese culture to American audiences through film. She produced, directed and wrote the screenplay for The Curse of Quon Gwon, the only film her company made. The film tells a love story featuring Wong's sister-in-law, Violet Wong, as the female lead, and Wong herself as the film's villain. Other members of Wong's family also had roles in the film. According to Violet Wong's grandson, Gregory Mark, the film was turned down from distribution.

Restoration process
In 1969, Violet Wong told her grandson Gregory Mark about a film canister in the basement of the family home and said: "You do something with it." Mark turned it into 16mm, and a few years later, Violet showed the film to her family. In 2004, filmmaker Arthur Dong learned of two nitrate reels and the 16mm print containing footage from The Curse of Quon Gwon that were in the possession of Violet Wong's descendants while researching his documentary film Hollywood Chinese. He was given access to the footage and took it the Academy Film Archive, which restored the film in 2005. , it is the earliest known Chinese American feature film and it is also one of the earliest films directed by a woman, Marion E. Wong. Most of the film remains missing.

Recognitions
In December 2006, the film was recognized as a culturally, historically and aesthetically significant film by the National Film Registry.

References

External links

The Curse of Quon Gwon essay by Daniel Eagan in America's Film Legacy: The Authoritative Guide to the Landmark Movies in the National Film Registry, A&C Black, 2010 , pages 55–56 
 The Curse of Quon Gwon'' dvd review on moviessilently.com

1916 films
1917 films
1910s rediscovered films
American silent short films
Films about Chinese Americans
American black-and-white films
United States National Film Registry films
Rediscovered American films
1910s English-language films
1910s American films